Irving Henry Webster Phillips Sr. or I. Henry Phillips, (January 16, 1920 – November 22, 1993) was a noted African-American photojournalist from Baltimore, Maryland. In 1946, after serving in World War II he became chief photographer at the Baltimore Afro-American newspaper. Phillips Sr. covered local and national news events such as the 1963 March on Washington, five presidential elections, and Martin Luther King, Jr.'s funeral.  He died in 1993 at age 73.

References

External links 

  
 Irving Henry Webster Phillips as listed in Baltimore City Historical Society History Honors Program – along with Jr and III.

African-American journalists
African-American photographers
Journalists from Maryland
American photojournalists
Writers from Baltimore
1920 births
1993 deaths
20th-century American journalists
American male journalists
20th-century African-American people
American military personnel of World War II